Georgios Kolovos (born 9 October 1965) is a Greek former professional football player who played as a forward.

Club career
Kolovos started his career from Apollon Larissa playing in Delta Ethniki. In the summer of 1985 he was transferred to the 1985 Greek Cup winners AE Larissa alongside another young talent, Vassilis Karapialis, and under experienced Polish coach Andrzej Strejlau. Kolovos stayed at AEL for three years becoming a Greek champion in 1988. The following year, he was released by the club after not being in Marcin Bochynek's plans and he signed for fourth division side Toxotis. He subsequently joined Ampelokipoi Larissa playing with the club in Delta Ethniki under coach Nikos Vlachoulis and the Larissa FCA league alongside his former AEL teammate Babis Ntosas and future Greece international Vangelis Moras.

References

1965 births
Living people

Greek footballers

Athlitiki Enosi Larissa F.C. players
Apollon Larissa F.C. players
Association football forwards
Footballers from Larissa